Enzo Gianni Tchato Mbiayi (born 23 November 2002) is a professional footballer who plays as a defender for  club Montpellier. Born in France, he represents Cameroon at youth international level.

Club career  

On 3 April 2022, Tchato made his professional debut for Montpellier as a substitute in a 2–1 Ligue 1 defeat at home to Brest. On 23 May, he signed his first professional contract with the club. His first league start came in a 3–2 home victory over Troyes on 7 August. On 13 August, Tchato scored his first professional goal in a 5–2 league defeat away to Paris Saint-Germain.

International career 

In January 2021, Tchato was called up to the Cameroon U20 national team for a training camp. In February, he participated in the 2021 Africa U-20 Cup of Nations in Mauritania, where his team reached the quarter-finals. At the tournament, Tchato was one of the "revelations" of the Cameroonian team.

Personal life 
Born in France, Tchato is of Cameroonian descent. His father Bill was a Cameroon international, and played for Montpellier as well.

References

External links 
 
 
 

2002 births
Living people
Footballers from Montpellier
French footballers
Cameroonian footballers
French sportspeople of Cameroonian descent
Citizens of Cameroon through descent
Black French sportspeople
Cameroon youth international footballers
Association football defenders
Montpellier HSC players
Championnat National 2 players
Championnat National 3 players
Ligue 1 players